Five Mile River may refer to:

 Five Mile River, a river located in Connecticut's Northeast Corner
Five Mile River (Long Island Sound), a river in Fairfield County, Connecticut
 Five Mile River (East Brookfield River)
 Five Mile River, Nova Scotia

See also 
 Five Mile Bridge (disambiguation)
Five Mile Creek (disambiguation)
 Five mile (disambiguation)